Parbattia is a genus of moths of the family Crambidae.

Species
Parbattia arisana Munroe & Mutuura, 1971
Parbattia excavata Zhang, Li & Wang in Zhang, Li, Wang & Song, 2003
Parbattia latifascialis South in Leech & South, 1901
Parbattia serrata Munroe & Mutuura, 1971
Parbattia vialis Moore, 1888

Former species
Parbattia aethiopicalis Hampson, 1913

References

Natural History Museum Lepidoptera genus database

Pyraustinae
Crambidae genera
Taxa named by Frederic Moore